Lassaba parvalbidaria is a moth in the family Geometridae. It is found in Taiwan and Nepal.

Subspecies
Lassaba parvalbidaria parvalbidaria (Taiwan)
Lassaba parvalbidaria nepalensis (Sato, 1993) (Nepal)

References

Moths described in 1978
Boarmiini
Moths of Asia
Moths of Taiwan